El Silencio (The Silence) is a studio album by Mexican rock band Caifanes, released in 1992. It was produced by Adrian Belew. It is the last Caifanes album to feature bassist Sabo Romo and keyboardist/saxophonist Diego Herrera.

Critical reception
Spin called the album a "heavenly hybrid of Roxy Music and Led Zeppelin." Chuck Eddy wrote that it "flows through cotton-candy high notes, rumbling ocean rhythms with upsurges that bellow like sea elephants, Salvation Army funeral-wake honking, stuttery little chamber-group guitar figures."

Track listing

Personnel

Caifanes
Saúl Hernández - vocals, electric guitar
Sabo Romo - electric bass, acoustic guitar
Diego Herrera - keyboards, saxophone, percussion, jarana
Alfonso André - drums, percussion
Alejandro Marcovich - lead guitar, requinto jarocho, ebow

Guest
Adrian Belew - guitar solo on "Piedra"

Certifications

References

Caifanes albums
1992 albums
Albums produced by Adrian Belew